Ognjen Kuzmanović (1895 – 1967) was a Serbian politician before and during World War II, who collaborated with the Axis powers during the war. 

He fought in the First and Second Balkan Wars. At the outbreak of World War I, he participated in the Serbian Campaign, the Thessalonica front, and fought in the battles of Kolubara, Dobro Pole, and Ovche Pole.

During World War II, he was appointed Minister of Construction of the Government of National Salvation in 1941, and retained that position until the government's collapse in October 1944. He joined the Zbor and became a member after the Invasion of Yugoslavia. He went to Germany after the war and lived there until his death in 1967.

References

Serbian politicians
Serbian collaborators with Nazi Germany
Serbian people of World War II
1895 births
1967 deaths